Patania costalis is a moth in the family Crambidae. It was described by Frederic Moore in 1888. It is found in Darjeeling, India.

References

Moths described in 1888
Moths of Asia
Spilomelinae
Taxa named by Frederic Moore